Luis Alejandro Abel Mayol Bouchon (born 27 November 1952) is a Chilean politician and businessman.

He served as the president of the Sociedad Nacional de Agricultura from 2009 to 2011.

On 11 March 2018, he assumed as Intendant of the Araucanía Region as part of the second government of Sebastián Piñera (2018–2022). However, after the questions he received as a result of his statements regarding Camilo Catrillanca death, he resigned from his position on 20 November of the same year.

References

External links
 Profile at La Tercera

1952 births
Living people
University of Chile alumni
National Renewal (Chile) politicians
21st-century Chilean politicians
Members of the Chilean Constitutional Convention
Intendants of Araucanía Region
Politicians from Santiago
Ministers of Agriculture of Chile